José Ndong Machín Dicombo (born 14 August 1996), also known as Pepín, is an Equatoguinean professional footballer who plays as an attacking midfielder for  club Monza and the Equatorial Guinea national team.

Club career
Born in Bata, Litoral Province, Machín has started his youth career for CE La Floresta, in Tarragona. In the middle of 2004, he joined FC Barcelona's youth setup and he remained there the next four seasons, coming back to La Floresta for a year. After a stint in FC Cambrils, Machín signed for Gimnàstic de Tarragona, where he relaunched his career as a young prospect. Two years later, in 2012, he and Aitor Embela, his teammate for Equatorial Guinea U16, were signed for Málaga CF.

On 2 November 2014, Machín made his senior debut with the reserves, coming on as a late substitute in a 2–0 home win against Villacarrillo CF in the Tercera División.

In late January 2015, Machín was transferred to A.S. Roma, being incorporated to the Primavera side. He played friendly matches with the first team in the middle of 2015 and was an unused substitute in several 2015–16 Serie A matches.

On 31 January 2019, he joined Parma on loan with a €2.5m obligation to buy. On 31 August 2019, Machín joined his former Serie B club Pescara on loan until 30 June 2020. He scored seven goals in 20 Serie B matches in the first half of the season.

On 31 January 2020, Machín moved on a six-month loan to Monza, with an obligation to purchase at the end of the season if certain conditions were met. After moving on a permanent deal to Monza, playing in the 2020–21 Serie B, Machin moved back to Pescara on 15 January 2021 on a six-month loan.

International career
Born in Equatorial Guinea, Machín moved to Spain at an early age and obtained dual citizenship. He chose to represent his native country, and made his full international debut for Equatorial Guinea on 12 November 2015, coming on as a second-half substitute in a 2–0 loss against Morocco.

Personal life
A few months after joining FC Barcelona, Machín confessed to being a fan of arch-rivals Real Madrid. He is the nephew of former footballer Juan Carlos Ecomba, who has played in Argentina for Chacarita and Nueva Chicago, among other clubs.

Career statistics

Club

International

Honours 
Monza
 Serie C Group A: 2019–20

References

External links

 Profile at A.C. Monza 
 
 
 
 

1996 births
Living people
People from Bata, Equatorial Guinea
Equatoguinean emigrants to Spain
Naturalised citizens of Spain
Equatoguinean footballers
Association football midfielders
FC Barcelona players
CF Reus Deportiu B players
Gimnàstic de Tarragona footballers
Málaga CF players
Atlético Malagueño players
A.S. Roma players
Trapani Calcio players
FC Lugano players
Brescia Calcio players
Delfino Pescara 1936 players
Parma Calcio 1913 players
A.C. Monza players
Tercera División players
Serie B players
Swiss Super League players
Serie A players
Serie C players
Equatorial Guinea youth international footballers
Equatorial Guinea international footballers
2021 Africa Cup of Nations players
Equatoguinean expatriate footballers
Equatoguinean expatriate sportspeople in Italy
Equatoguinean expatriate sportspeople in Switzerland
Expatriate footballers in Italy
Expatriate footballers in Switzerland